Haukur Jóhannsson (born 17 January 1953) is an Icelandic alpine skier. He competed in two events at the 1976 Winter Olympics.

References

1953 births
Living people
Haukur Jóhannsson
Haukur Jóhannsson
Alpine skiers at the 1976 Winter Olympics
Haukur Jóhannsson
20th-century Icelandic people